Artūrs Zeiberliņš (14 November 1897 – 3 May 1963) was a Latvian cyclist. He competed in two events at the 1924 Summer Olympics.

References

External links
 

1897 births
1963 deaths
Latvian male cyclists
Olympic cyclists of Latvia
Cyclists at the 1924 Summer Olympics